The Richmond Bar is a bar in Portland, Oregon, United States.

Description
The Richmond Bar is located in southeast Portland's Richmond neighborhood. The bar offers beer and cocktails in a "rustic and cozy space", according to Thrillist. Beers from Oregon and Europe are available; according to Matthew Korfhage of Willamette Week, the cocktails "skew sweetly medicinal" and the "neutral-and-red-hued bar has honed the refined, unshowy comforts now expected of a Portland bar".

History
Co-owners Martin Schwartz and Nate Tilden opened the bar in 2013, in a space formerly occupied by Matchbox Lounge. A back patio was added in 2015, increasing seating capacity by 30 people. In 2016, Tilden was nominated for a James Beard Foundation Award as restaurateur of Clyde Common, Olympia Provisions, Spirit of 77, and The Richmond Bar. The bar closed temporarily during the COVID-19 pandemic.

Reception
In The Oregonian 2014 list of "Portland's 10 best new bars", Samantha Bakall recommended the cocktails and described the bar as "deceivingly complex, with far more to offer than a waiting area for Pok Pok across the street. Let the simple, illuminated 'bar' sign hanging on the building draw you into the surprisingly handsome and cozy spot with a British-meets-Pacific Northwest vibe decorated with tufted leather booths, imported wall paper and large wooden tables." Matthew Korfhage said in Willamette Week 2015 bar guide of the city:

References

External links

 
 The Richmond Bar at Portland Monthly
 The Richmond Bar at Zomato

2013 establishments in Oregon
Drinking establishments in Oregon
Restaurants established in 2013
Restaurants in Portland, Oregon
Richmond, Portland, Oregon